The Marvelous Palace And Other Stories is a collection of short stories by French author Pierre Boulle, published in French in 1976 and in English in 1977. The English language edition is translated by Margaret Giovanelli. The collection contains six stories, all thematically related, and presented in the voice of a centenarian story-teller from the Orient.

The collection includes an introduction, in which the narrator introduces the storyteller, who is generally referred to as "Old Man." After the introduction, each of the six short stories is narrated by the Old Man:
The Royal Pardon
The Marvelous Palace
The Laws
The Limits of Endurance
Compassion Service
The Angelic Monsieur Edyh

The stories are all recountings of tales from the Old Man's distant past as a minister of "the Religion of Doubt" in the far off Kingdom of Shandong. Each story presents a brief moral dilemma, usually with a surprise ending.

French short story collections
1976 short story collections
Vanguard Press books